Madlyn Soloman Rhue (née Madeline Roche, October 3, 1935 – December 16, 2003) was an American film and television actress.

Early life and education
Rhue was born in Washington, D.C., graduated from Los Angeles High School, and studied drama at Los Angeles City College.

Entertainment career
Rhue debuted in show business at age 17 as a dancer at the Copacabana night club in New York City. At that time she decided to create a stage name for herself by adapting the title of the film 13 Rue Madeleine (1947). From the 1950s to the 1990s, she appeared in some 20 films, including Operation Petticoat, The Ladies Man, A Majority of One, It's a Mad, Mad, Mad, Mad World (1963), Kenner (1969), and Stand Up and Be Counted (1972).

Rhue guest-starred in dozens of television series, beginning with Cheyenne (1955).  She played the spouse of the character portrayed by Ricardo Montalbán in a 1960 episode of Bonanza, "Day of Reckoning". That year, she also played the title role of Marian Ames in the Perry Mason episode "The Case of the Wayward Wife" and appeared in Route 66 Season 3 Episode 9.

Later in the 1960s, her appearances included Stagecoach West (1961),   Rawhide (1963), The Defenders (1965) in Whipping Boy as Christine Knox and the classic Star Trek episode "Space Seed" (1967) where she once again appeared opposite Ricardo Montalbán (who played Khan Noonien Singh) playing his love interest Lt. Marla McGivers.

Rhue played regulars Marjorie Grant in Bracken's World (1969–70) and Hilary Madison in Executive Suite (1976–77).  Other guest appearances included Have Gun – Will Travel, Gunsmoke, The Alfred Hitchcock Hour (as Consuela Sandino in episode "The Dark Pool"), Route 66  (as Ara Rados in the episode, "Every Father's Daughter"), The Untouchables, The Rebel, Perry Mason, The Man from U.N.C.L.E., The Fugitive, Ironside, The Wild Wild West, Mannix, Hawaii Five-O, Mission: Impossible, Longstreet, Fantasy Island, Charlie's Angels (as Georgia in "Angels on the Street" in 1979) and Fame (as Angela Schwartz). She also appeared in the television movie Goldie and the Boxer, and made appearances on the game show The Match Game during 1974–1976.

In the early 1960s, Rhue was injured in an automobile accident that resulted in lost teeth and a cut lower lip. She was hospitalized before returning to acting.

In 1962, Rhue married actor Tony Young and acted with him in the Western He Rides Tall. They divorced in 1970.

Multiple sclerosis and later entertainment career 
In 1977, Rhue was diagnosed with multiple sclerosis. She continued to work, including a role in Days of Our Lives, but by 1985, Rhue's legs had become so weak from the multiple sclerosis that she could only get around by wheelchair. Once becoming a wheelchair user, Rhue described feelings of fear and anxiety over being unable to land on-screen work in the entertainment industry for a period of 11 months. Regarding the matter, she was quoted as stating, "It became apparent that I would have to invent a giant accident to explain the wheelchair or start telling the truth".

Despite being reliant on a wheelchair, Rhue managed to resume her entertainment career and was praised by media outlets for not allowing her health issues to overthrow her career. She played intermittent roles that did not require her to walk or stand, sometimes incorporating the wheelchair as part of the character. For example, she played a wheelchair-using ballistics expert on the CBS police-based legal drama, Houston Knights. She also played a judge role in the scripted court show, Trial by Jury, lasting only the 1989–90 television season. She performed the role in a wheelchair, unseen to viewers as she presided from the judge's bench. Her part as a female judge was uncharacteristic for court shows, the genre dominated by men performing the judge role to that point. She also performed a recurring role in Murder, She Wrote, said to be her last television role. Angela Lansbury created a role for her when she heard that Rhue was at risk of losing her health insurance because she could no longer work enough hours.

Contrary to rumors, her illness apparently had nothing to do with her not reprising the Star Trek role of Lt. Marla McGivers in the film Star Trek II: The Wrath of Khan (1982). At the time of the film's production start in late 1981, Rhue was still mobile and appearing in television roles, but hiding her diagnosis for fear of it impacting her career. Director Nicholas Meyer stated that he wrote McGivers out of his drafts of the film (with a line referencing the character's death) in order to give the Khan character additional motivation for seeking vengeance.

In 1991, in her last movie, she played a wheelchair using character in the made for television thriller A Mother's Justice.

Death 
Rhue eventually became completely incapacitated by multiple sclerosis and died from pneumonia at the age of 68 at the Motion Picture & Television Country House and Hospital in Woodland Hills in Los Angeles, California.

Religion and politics 
Rhue adhered to Judaism outside of her marriage to Young, during which she partook in Catholicism. She was also a registered Republican who supported the administrations of Gerald Ford, Ronald Reagan, and George H. W. Bush.

Partial filmography

References

External links

 Madlyn Rhue, Television Actress, Dies at 68
 
 

1935 births
2003 deaths
20th-century American actresses
Actresses from Los Angeles
Actresses from Washington, D.C.
American film actresses
American television actresses
Deaths from pneumonia in California
Los Angeles City College alumni
Los Angeles High School alumni
People with multiple sclerosis
California Republicans
Washington (state) Republicans
Jewish American actresses
American Roman Catholics
20th-century American Jews
21st-century American Jews
21st-century American women